Michael Silver, Mike Silver or Michael Silvers may refer to:
Michael Silver (CEO) (born 1955), American Elements CEO
Michael Silver (sportswriter), American sportswriter
Michael B. Silver (born 1967), American actor
Michael Silver, better known as CFCF, Canadian electronic musician
Mike Silver, U.S. Army officer who assisted in the capture of the enemy combatant Omar Khadr
Michael Silvers, sound editor at Pixar
Mike Silver (musician) (born 1945), UK singer-songwriter